Cristigibba is a genus of air-breathing land snail, a terrestrial pulmonate gastropod mollusk in the family Camaenidae.

Species
Species within the genus Cristigibba:
 Cristigibba wesselensis

References

 
Camaenidae
Taxonomy articles created by Polbot